"Imperial Edward" is an American military march composed in 1902 by John Philip Sousa, and dedicated to Edward VII, King of the United Kingdom. Sousa received permission to dedicate the march to Edward VII during a conversation with the royal family after his command performance concert at Sandringham on December 1, 1901. The march was premiered by Sousa's band with a performance in Montreal on May 21, 1902. Sousa would later conduct the piece for King Edward in January 1903, during a performance at Windsor Castle.

History 

In 1901, the Sousa Band took a tour of England. On December 1, 1901, at Sandringham House, Sousa and his band played a command performance in honor of Queen Alexandra’s birthday. After the performance, in a conversation with the royal family, Sousa "requested and received permission" to dedicate a march to King Edward VII. Edward became king eleven months prior, following the death of his mother Queen Victoria in January. On December 2⁠, the day after the concert⁠, King Edward decorated Sousa with the Medal of the Royal Victorian Order. Sousa's tour was mildly caricatured in Harper's Weekly as the "American invasion, or rag time at the Court of St. James."

The first draft of "Imperial Edward" was finished in April 1902 while Sousa was on vacation in Hot Springs, Virginia, and the march was premiered by the Sousa band on May 21, 1902 during a concert in Montreal. "Imperial Edward" was published by John Church Company, Cincinnati, in 1902. The cover of the John Church sheet music states that the march is "Respectfully dedicated by special permission to His Most Gracious Majesty Edward VII." John Church Company also created what has been described as a "beautiful" illuminated manuscript of the march. This illuminated manuscript was brought to England by George Frederick Hinton, manager of the Sousa Band, and is currently held at the British Museum. Sousa would meet Edward VII again in 1903, when he undertook another command performance at Windsor Castle on January 31. Beginning at 10 PM, this concert was attended by the royal family in addition to "several foreign dignitaries" and the band of the Scots Guards, who were invited by King Edward to attend Sousa's performance. "Imperial Edward" was among the pieces performed, along with "El Capitan," "Hands Across the Sea," “The Stars and Stripes Forever,” and "God Save the King."

To date, "Imperial Edward" has been performed twice at The Proms in London, in September 1903 and August 1904; on both occasions the performances were at Queen's Hall in Langham Place, later destroyed by an incendiary bomb in 1941 during the Blitz. For both performances the piece was conducted by Sir Henry Wood.

Sousa's opinion of the march 
Sousa himself, "for some reason," voiced his unhappiness with "Imperial Edward" nearly twenty-two years after the march was written, in the Sousa Band programs at Willow Grove in 1923. The 1923 Willow Grove program bore the following  passage:

Musical structure 

The trio of the march quotes "God Save the King" in a trombone solo. When the Sousa Band performed "Imperial Edward," it was "customary" for the trombone section "to rise...play the brief solo fortissimo, and then be seated."

The U.S. Marine Band has published notes on Sousa's own performance practices for a number of his marches; for "Imperial Edward," the Marine Band performance recommendations are:

For the Introduction (m. 1-8):

For the First Strain (m. 8-25):

For the Second Strain (m. 25-42):

For the Trio (m. 42-74):

For the Break Strain (m. 74-86):

And for the Final Strain (m. 86-103):

See also 
 List of marches by John Philip Sousa

References 

Sousa marches
American military marches
Songs written by John Philip Sousa
Concert band pieces